The 1942 Qantas Short Empire shoot-down was an incident that occurred in the early days of the Pacific War during World War II. A Short Empire flying boat airliner, Corio, operated by Qantas was shot down by Japanese aircraft off the coast of West Timor, Dutch East Indies, on 30 January 1942, killing 13 of the occupants.

Aircraft history

Corio, named after Corio, Victoria, was built as an S.23 Empire by Short Brothers and entered service with Qantas in October 1938 registered as VH-ABD then was sold to Imperial Airways in September 1939. The airliner, after being re-registered in the UK as G-AEUH, was then leased back to Qantas.

Air attack
On 30 January 1942, G-AEUH, captained by A. A. (Aub) Koch, left Darwin at dawn, for Kupang, West Timor, en route to Surabaya, where it was to pick up refugees from the Japanese invasion of Java and transport them to Australia.

Koch immediately increased the speed of the aircraft and dived it towards the coast, attempting to evade the attack; the aircraft reached its maximum speed – possibly  – and flew a zig-zagging course, so low that the airliner's wing floats were bouncing off the sea. Nevertheless, the Zero pilots soon achieved numerous hits, perforating the fuselage and killing some passengers. Following a sudden loss of power when two engines caught fire, Corio hit the sea at high speed, nose first,  from the mouth of the Noelmini River; the impact breaking the fuselage in half.

Out of a total of 18 passengers and crew, 13 were killed in the attack. Koch, wounded in an arm and leg, was thrown out of the wreckage by the impact. However, he managed to swim ashore, a feat which took him three hours. Koch and the other survivors were later rescued by a Dornier Do 24 flying boat of the Royal Netherlands Navy. Three passengers and two crew were saved.

Koch later survived another attack by Japanese aircraft and the crash of another Empire flying boat. On 19 February 1942, while he was recuperating in Darwin Hospital, the town experienced two major air raids. On 22 April 1943, Koch was piloting Camilla, another Qantas Short Empire, on a flight from Australia to New Guinea, when it crashed in the sea off Port Moresby in bad weather.

See also
 List of Qantas fatal accidents
1942 KNILM Douglas DC-3 shootdown

References

Notes

Bibliography
 Cassidy, Brian. Flying Empires: Short ‘C’ class Empire flying boats. Bath UK: Queens Parade Press, 2004. Access date: 11 July 2010.
 Gunn, John. Challenging Horizons: Qantas 1939–1954, St Lucia Qld: University of Queensland Press, 1987

Airliner shootdown incidents
Dutch East Indies
1942 in Australia
Mass murder in 1942
1942 in Indonesia
Aviation accidents and incidents in 1942
Aviation accidents and incidents in Indonesia
Qantas accidents and incidents
20th-century aircraft shootdown incidents
January 1942 events
1942 disasters in Asia